Divo Biomass Power Station, also Soden Biomass Power Station, is a  biomass-fired thermal power plant under development in Ivory Coast. Société des Energies Nouvelles, an Ivorian IPP is leading the development of this biomass waste-to-energy infrastructure project. The main fuel is intended to be cocoa bean shells, cocoa pod husks and "cocoa sweatings". The U.S. Trade and Development Agency (USTDA) has provided partial funding for this power station.

Location
The power plant is under development in the city of Divo, in Divo Department, Gôh-Djiboua District,  in the Lôh-Djiboua Region, in the central southern part of the country.

Overview
Ivory Coast is the world's leading producer of cocoa, accounting for more than 40 percent of global production, as of 2021. The cocoa bean is a small component of the cocoa plant. While the bean is transformed into chocolate, confectionery and cocoa drinks, the rest of the fruit is thrown away as waste.

Société des Energies Nouvelles (Soden) (English: New Energy Company), an Ivorian business, is in the process of building a power station with capacity between 60 and 70 megawatts, derived from incinerating biomass, primarily cocoa waste. With abundant raw material, other biomass-fired power stations are in the planning stages around the country.

Ownership
The power station is owned and is under development by SODEN, an Ivorian IPP.

See also

List of power stations in Ivory Coast
Ayebo Biomass Power Station
Kakamega Waste To Energy Plant

References

External links
 Ivory Coast studies first cocoa-fired power station As of 2 July 2018.

Power stations in Ivory Coast
Gôh-Djiboua District
Biofuel power stations in Ivory Coast